Holy Name Church or Holy Name Catholic Church or Church of the Holy Name may refer to:

in Australia
Holy Name Cathedral, Brisbane - Roman Catholic church in Queensland, Australia

in Canada
Church of the Holy Name, Toronto

in India
Cathedral of the Holy Name, Mumbai - a Roman Catholic cathedral in the Indian city of Mumbai (Bombay) and the seat of the Bombay Diocese

in the United Kingdom
The Holy Name Church Manchester - a Jesuit church in Manchester, UK

in the United States
(by state)
Church of the Holy Name (Stamford, Connecticut), listed on the National Register of Historic Places (NRHP) in Fairfield County
Holy Name Cathedral, Chicago - the seat of the Roman Catholic Archdiocese of Chicago, Illinois
Church of the Holy Name (Topeka, Kansas), listed on the NRHP in Shawnee County
Holy Name Church Rectory, Convent and School, Louisville, Kentucky, listed on the NRHP in Jefferson County
Holy Name of Jesus Complex, Worcester, Massachusetts, listed on the NRHP in Worcester County
Holy Name Church - a Roman Catholic church in Birmingham, Michigan
Holy Name Catholic Church (Kansas City, Missouri), listed on the NRHP in Jackson County
Holy Name of Jesus R.C. Church - a Roman Catholic church in New York City, New York

See also
Holy Name (disambiguation)